Giuseppe Pericu (20 October 1937 – 13 June 2022) was an Italian politician.

A long-time member of the Italian Socialist Party, he joined the Democratic Party of the Left in 1996.

He was the mayor of Genoa from 1997 to 2007.

References

1937 births
2022 deaths
Deputies of Legislature XII of Italy
Italian Socialist Party politicians
Democratic Party of the Left politicians
Democratic Party (Italy) politicians
Mayors of Genoa
20th-century Italian politicians